The 1991 Toronto Blue Jays season was the franchise's 15th season of Major League Baseball. It resulted in the Blue Jays finishing first in the American League East with a record of 91 wins and 71 losses. The team's paid attendance of 4,001,527 led the major leagues, as the Jays became the first team in MLB history to draw four million fans in a season. Toronto lost the ALCS to the eventual world champion Minnesota Twins in five games.

Offseason
On December 4, 1990, the San Diego Padres and Blue Jays made one of the biggest blockbuster deals of the decade. The Padres traded second baseman Roberto Alomar and outfielder Joe Carter to the Blue Jays in exchange for first baseman Fred McGriff and shortstop Tony Fernández. Blue Jays GM Pat Gillick and Padres GM Joe McIlvaine originally talked about just trading Joe Carter for Fred McGriff. The Padres were losing Jack Clark and needed a new first baseman. The Blue Jays had John Olerud ready to take over at first base but were losing outfielder George Bell. Gillick decided to up the ante by trying to get Alomar. Gillick figured that with Garry Templeton in the twilight of his career, Fernández would be an adequate replacement. Alomar feuded with Padres manager Greg Riddoch and the thinking was that Bip Roberts and Joey Cora could platoon at second base. Over the next two seasons, Alomar and Carter would help the Blue Jays win the 1992 and 1993 World Series.

Transactions
 October 24, 1990: Jim Eppard was released by the Blue Jays.
 November 26, 1990: Ken Dayley was signed as a free agent by the Blue Jays.
 December 2, 1990: Junior Félix, Luis Sojo and a player to be named later were traded by the Blue Jays to the California Angels for Devon White, Willie Fraser and Marcus Moore. The Blue Jays completed the deal by sending Ken Rivers (minors) to the Angels on December 4.
 December 4, 1990: Fred McGriff and Tony Fernández were traded by the Blue Jays to the San Diego Padres for Joe Carter and Roberto Alomar.
 December 5, 1990: Pat Tabler was signed as a free agent by the Blue Jays.
 December 14, 1990: Paul Kilgus was traded by the Blue Jays to the Baltimore Orioles for Mickey Weston.

Regular season
 May 1, 1991: The Blue Jays were part of baseball history, as Nolan Ryan threw his seventh and last no-hitter against them in Arlington.
 July 1, 1991: Joe Carter was named the AL Player of the Month for the month of June.
 August 13, 1991: After making 25 consecutive save opportunities, Tom Henke picked up a blown save after Paul Molitor hit a home run in the ninth.
 October 2, 1991: The Blue Jays clinched the American League East title in a 6-5 walk-off win over the California Angels. Joe Carter hit the game-winning single. The Jays also became the first team to have their season attendance pass the 4 million mark.

Opening Day starters
 Roberto Alomar
 Joe Carter
 Kelly Gruber
 Manuel Lee
 Rance Mulliniks
 Greg Myers
 John Olerud
 Dave Stieb
 Devon White
 Mookie Wilson

Season standings

Record vs. opponents

Notable transactions
 June 3, 1991: 1991 Major League Baseball draft
Shawn Green was drafted by the Blue Jays in the 1st round (16th pick). Player signed September 25, 1991.
Jeff Ware was drafted by the Blue Jays in the 1st round (35th pick). Player signed August 25, 1991.
Dante Powell was drafted by the Blue Jays in the 1st round (42nd pick), but did not sign.
Chris Stynes was drafted by the Blue Jays in the 3rd round. Player signed June 4, 1991.
Alex Gonzalez was drafted by the Blue Jays in the 14th round. Player signed June 12, 1991.
 June 4, 1991: Kenny Williams was selected off waivers from the Blue Jays by the Montreal Expos.
 June 27, 1991: Glenallen Hill, Denis Boucher, Mark Whiten, and cash were traded by the Blue Jays to the Cleveland Indians for Tom Candiotti and Turner Ward.
 July 14, 1991: Shawn Jeter and a player to be named later were traded by the Blue Jays to the Chicago White Sox for Cory Snyder. The Blue Jays completed the deal by sending Steve Wapnick to the White Sox on September 4.
 August 9, 1991: Rob Wishnevski (minors) and a player to be named later were traded by the Blue Jays to the Milwaukee Brewers for Candy Maldonado. The Blue Jays completed the deal by sending William Suero to the Brewers on August 14.
 September 14, 1991: Dave Parker was signed as a free agent by the Blue Jays.

Roster

Manager Cito Gaston was sidelined with a herniated disc  from August 21 to September 25. Gene Tenace served as the team's interim manager, going 19–14 and keeping the Jays in first place in the AL East for the duration of Gaston's absence.

Game log

|- align="center" bgcolor="ffbbbb"
| 1 || April 8 || Red Sox || 6 – 2 || Clemens (1-0) || Stieb (0-1) || || 50,114 || 0-1
|- align="center" bgcolor="bbffbb"
| 2 || April 9 || Red Sox || 4 – 3 || Key (1-0) || Harris (0-1) || Henke (1) || 42,211 || 1-1
|- align="center" bgcolor="bbffbb"
| 3 || April 10 || Red Sox || 5 – 3 || Timlin (1-0) || Gray (0-1) || Henke (2) || 41,164 || 2-1
|- align="center" bgcolor="bbffbb"
| 4 || April 11 || Brewers || 7 – 3 || Wells (1-0) || Robinson (0-1) || || 38,326 || 3-1
|- align="center" bgcolor="bbffbb"
| 5 || April 12 || Brewers || 5 – 4 (11) || Timlin (2-0) || Plesac (0-1) || || 43,150 || 4-1
|- align="center" bgcolor="ffbbbb"
| 6 || April 13 || Brewers || 7 – 3 || Brown (1-0) || Stieb (0-2) || Crim (1) || 49,872 || 4-2
|- align="center" bgcolor="bbffbb"
| 7 || April 14 || Brewers || 9 – 0 || Key (2-0) || August (0-1) || || 47,136 || 5-2
|- align="center" bgcolor="bbffbb"
| 8 || April 15 || @ Tigers || 4 – 3 || Stottlemyre (1-0) || Terrell (0-2) || Ward (1) || 9,632 || 6-2
|- align="center" bgcolor="ffbbbb"
| 9 || April 16 || @ Tigers || 6 – 2 || Gullickson (1-0) || Wells (1-1) || Henneman (2) || 10,791 || 6-3
|- align="center" bgcolor="ffbbbb"
| 10 || April 17 || @ Tigers || 5 – 4 (10) || Henneman (1-0) || Ward (0-1) || || 16,355 || 6-4
|- align="center" bgcolor="bbffbb"
| 11 || April 19 || @ Brewers || 5 – 2 || Stieb (1-2) || August (0-2) || || 9,604 || 7-4
|- align="center" bgcolor="bbffbb"
| 12 || April 20 || @ Brewers || 4 – 2 || Key (3-0) || Bosio (1-2) || Ward (2) || 13,545 || 8-4
|- align="center" bgcolor="ffbbbb"
| 13 || April 21 || @ Brewers || 11 – 8 (10) || Crim (1-0) || Wills (0-1) || || 14,920 || 8-5
|- align="center" bgcolor="ffbbbb"
| 14 || April 22 || @ Red Sox || 6 – 4 || Lamp (1-1) || Wells (1-2) || Reardon (4) || 25,841 || 8-6
|- align="center" bgcolor="ffbbbb"
| 15 || April 23 || @ Red Sox || 3 – 0 || Clemens (4-0) || Boucher (0-1) || Reardon (5) || 29,904 || 8-7
|- align="center" bgcolor="bbffbb"
| 16 || April 24 || @ Red Sox || 6 – 1 || Stieb (2-2) || Young (0-1) || || 28,841 || 9-7
|- align="center" bgcolor="bbffbb"
| 17 || April 25 || Tigers || 3 – 2 || Key (4-0) || Petry (0-1) || Ward (3) || 49,688 || 10-7
|- align="center" bgcolor="bbffbb"
| 18 || April 26 || Tigers || 5 – 4 || Stottlemyre (2-0) || Terrell (0-3) || Ward (4) || 50,170 || 11-7
|- align="center" bgcolor="ffbbbb"
| 19 || April 27 || Tigers || 4 – 2 || Gullickson (2-0) || Wells (1-3) || Henneman (3) || 50,211 || 11-8
|- align="center" bgcolor="bbffbb"
| 20 || April 28 || Tigers || 9 – 6 || Timlin (3-0) || Leiter (0-1) || Ward (5) || 50,134 || 12-8
|- align="center" bgcolor="ffbbbb"
| 21 || April 30 || @ Rangers || 8 – 5 || Gossage (2-0) || Acker (0-1) || Russell (5) || 24,873 || 12-9
|-

|- align="center" bgcolor="ffbbbb"
| 22 || May 1 || @ Rangers || 3 – 0 || Ryan (3-2) || Key (4-1) || || 33,439 || 12-10
|- align="center" bgcolor="bbffbb"
| 23 || May 2 || @ Royals || 3 – 1 || Stottlemyre (3-0) || Appier (1-4) || Ward (6) || 22,896 || 13-10
|- align="center" bgcolor="bbffbb"
| 24 || May 3 || @ Royals || 5 – 1 || Wells (2-3) || Davis (2-2) || || 20,809 || 14-10
|- align="center" bgcolor="ffbbbb"
| 25 || May 4 || @ Royals || 6 – 5 || Saberhagen (2-3) || Boucher (0-2) || Montgomery (6) || 22,628 || 14-11
|- align="center" bgcolor="bbffbb"
| 26 || May 5 || @ Royals || 3 – 0 || Stieb (3-2) || Gordon (1-2) || Ward (7) || 22,588 || 15-11
|- align="center" bgcolor="ffbbbb"
| 27 || May 7 || Rangers || 3 – 2 || Rogers (1-3) || Key (4-2) || Russell (6) || 44,622 || 15-12
|- align="center" bgcolor="bbffbb"
| 28 || May 8 || Rangers || 4 – 2 || Stottlemyre (4-0) || Ryan (3-3) || Ward (8) || 43,211 || 16-12
|- align="center" bgcolor="bbffbb"
| 29 || May 9 || White Sox || 2 – 0 || Wells (3-3) || Pérez (1-2) || Ward (9) || 47,236 || 17-12
|- align="center" bgcolor="ffbbbb"
| 30 || May 10 || White Sox || 5 – 3 (12) || Radinsky (2-1) || Fraser (0-1) || || 50,198 || 17-13
|- align="center" bgcolor="bbffbb"
| 31 || May 11 || White Sox || 5 – 2 || Stieb (4-2) || Hough (0-2) || Ward (10) || 50,206 || 18-13
|- align="center" bgcolor="bbffbb"
| 32 || May 12 || White Sox || 4 – 2 || Key (5-2) || Hibbard (2-1) || Ward (11) || 50,108 || 19-13
|- align="center" bgcolor="bbffbb"
| 33 || May 13 || Royals || 4 – 2 || Stottlemyre (5-0) || Davis (2-4) || Ward (12) || 44,275 || 20-13
|- align="center" bgcolor="bbffbb"
| 34 || May 14 || Royals || 4 – 1 || Wells (4-3) || Gubicza (0-1) || Timlin (1) || 43,357 || 21-13
|- align="center" bgcolor="ffbbbb"
| 35 || May 15 || Royals || 6 – 4 || Saberhagen (4-3) || Boucher (0-3) || || 50,113 || 21-14
|- align="center" bgcolor="ffbbbb"
| 36 || May 17 || @ White Sox || 5 – 3 || Pall (1-1) || Timlin (3-1) || Thigpen (7) || 30,095 || 21-15
|- align="center" bgcolor="bbffbb"
| 37 || May 18 || @ White Sox || 9 – 2 || Key (6-2) || Hibbard (2-2) || || 34,861 || 22-15
|- align="center" bgcolor="ffbbbb"
| 38 || May 19 || @ White Sox || 5 – 4 || Patterson (1-0) || Timlin (3-2) || Thigpen (8) || 41,015 || 22-16
|- align="center" bgcolor="bbffbb"
| 39 || May 20 || @ Athletics || 1 – 0 || Wells (5-3) || Welch (4-3) || Henke (3) || 24,631 || 23-16
|- align="center" bgcolor="bbffbb"
| 40 || May 21 || @ Athletics || 11 – 7 || Acker (1-1) || Dressendorfer (3-3) || Timlin (2) || 22,738 || 24-16
|- align="center" bgcolor="ffbbbb"
| 41 || May 22 || @ Athletics || 2 – 1 || Moore (6-2) || Stieb (4-3) || Eckersley (11) || 34,028 || 24-17
|- align="center" bgcolor="bbffbb"
| 42 || May 24 || @ Angels || 3 – 2 || Timlin (4-2) || Finley (7-2) || Henke (4) || 26,408 || 25-17
|- align="center" bgcolor="ffbbbb"
| 43 || May 25 || @ Angels || 5 – 0 || McCaskill (4-5) || Stottlemyre (5-1) || || 36,732 || 25-18
|- align="center" bgcolor="ffbbbb"
| 44 || May 26 || @ Angels || 6 – 2 || Langston (6-1) || Wells (5-4) || || 45,307 || 25-19
|- align="center" bgcolor="ffbbbb"
| 45 || May 28 || Athletics || 8 – 4 || Moore (7-2) || Acker (1-2) || Eckersley (12) || 50,299 || 25-20
|- align="center" bgcolor="bbffbb"
| 46 || May 29 || Athletics || 8 – 3 || Key (7-2) || Slusarski (1-2) || Henke (5) || 50,262 || 26-20
|- align="center" bgcolor="ffbbbb"
| 47 || May 30 || Athletics || 8 – 6 || Klink (4-2) || Ward (0-2) || Eckersley (13) || 50,271 || 26-21
|- align="center" bgcolor="bbffbb"
| 48 || May 31 || Angels || 5 – 1 || Wells (6-4) || Langston (6-2) || || 50,252 || 27-21
|-

|- align="center" bgcolor="ffbbbb"
| 49 || June 1 || Angels || 11 – 8 || Eichhorn (1-1) || Fraser (0-2) || Harvey (13) || 50,255 || 27-22
|- align="center" bgcolor="ffbbbb"
| 50 || June 2 || Angels || 7 – 2 || Abbott (5-4) || Acker (1-3) || || 50,261 || 27-23
|- align="center" bgcolor="bbffbb"
| 51 || June 3 || @ Yankees || 5 – 3 || Key (8-2) || Leary (3-5) || Henke (6) || 17,003 || 28-23
|- align="center" bgcolor="ffbbbb"
| 52 || June 4 || @ Yankees || 5 – 3 || Sanderson (7-2) || Stottlemyre (5-2) || Farr (4) || 15,955 || 28-24
|- align="center" bgcolor="bbffbb"
| 53 || June 5 || @ Yankees || 4 – 1 || Wells (7-4) || Johnson (0-1) || Henke (7) || 21,213 || 29-24
|- align="center" bgcolor="ffbbbb"
| 54 || June 6 || @ Orioles || 6 – 4 || Milacki (2-2) || Timlin (4-3) || Olson (9) || 26,539 || 29-25
|- align="center" bgcolor="ffbbbb"
| 55 || June 7 || @ Orioles || 6 – 4 || Smith (3-0) || Guzmán (0-1) || Olson (10) || 38,228 || 29-26
|- align="center" bgcolor="bbffbb"
| 56 || June 8 || @ Orioles || 8 – 4 || Key (9-2) || Kilgus (0-1) || || 45,569 || 30-26
|- align="center" bgcolor="bbffbb"
| 57 || June 9 || @ Orioles || 3 – 2 || Stottlemyre (6-2) || Ballard (3-7) || Henke (8) || 27,783 || 31-26
|- align="center" bgcolor="ffbbbb"
| 58 || June 11 || @ Indians || 2 – 1 (12) || Hillegas (2-0) || Acker (1-4) || || 10,753 || 31-27
|- align="center" bgcolor="bbffbb"
| 59 || June 12 || @ Indians || 1 – 0 || Timlin (5-3) || Candiotti (7-4) || Henke (9) || 8,089 || 32-27
|- align="center" bgcolor="bbffbb"
| 60 || June 13 || @ Indians || 1 – 0 || Key (10-2) || Nagy (2-7) || || 8,371 || 33-27
|- align="center" bgcolor="bbffbb"
| 61 || June 14 || Orioles || 9 – 1 || Stottlemyre (7-2) || Robinson (3-6) || || 50,287 || 34-27
|- align="center" bgcolor="ffbbbb"
| 62 || June 15 || Orioles || 8 – 4 || Ballard (4-7) || Guzmán (0-2) || Williamson (3) || 50,292 || 34-28
|- align="center" bgcolor="ffbbbb"
| 63 || June 16 || Orioles || 13 – 8 || Frohwirth (1-0) || Ward (0-3) || || 50,273 || 34-29
|- align="center" bgcolor="ffbbbb"
| 64 || June 18 || Yankees || 4 – 2 || Kamieniecki (1-0) || Timlin (5-4) || Farr (7) || 50,271 || 34-30
|- align="center" bgcolor="ffbbbb"
| 65 || June 19 || Yankees || 3 – 0 || Johnson (1-2) || Key (10-3) || Howe (1) || 50,281 || 34-31
|- align="center" bgcolor="bbffbb"
| 66 || June 20 || Yankees || 6 – 1 || Stottlemyre (8-2) || Leary (3-7) || || 50,256 || 35-31
|- align="center" bgcolor="bbffbb"
| 67 || June 21 || Indians || 8 – 4 || Wells (8-4) || Swindell (3-6) || Henke (10) || 50,283 || 36-31
|- align="center" bgcolor="bbffbb"
| 68 || June 22 || Indians || 4 – 0 || Guzmán (1-2) || Mutis (0-2) || Ward (13) || 50,285 || 37-31
|- align="center" bgcolor="bbffbb"
| 69 || June 23 || Indians || 3 – 1 || MacDonald (1-0) || Candiotti (7-6) || Henke (11) || 50,275 || 38-31
|- align="center" bgcolor="bbffbb"
| 70 || June 24 || Indians || 4 – 3 || Ward (1-3) || Nagy (3-8) || Henke (12) || 50,263 || 39-31
|- align="center" bgcolor="ffbbbb"
| 71 || June 25 || @ Twins || 8 – 6 || Morris (10-5) || Stottlemyre (8-3) || Aguilera (20) || 26,350 || 39-32
|- align="center" bgcolor="bbffbb"
| 72 || June 26 || @ Twins || 5 – 2 || Wells (9-4) || Guthrie (5-4) || Henke (13) || 25,503 || 40-32
|- align="center" bgcolor="bbffbb"
| 73 || June 27 || @ Twins || 1 – 0 || Guzmán (2-2) || Tapani (5-7) || Henke (14) || 35,598 || 41-32
|- align="center" bgcolor="ffbbbb"
| 74 || June 28 || Mariners || 3 – 1 || Krueger (5-3) || Candiotti (7-7) || Jackson (13) || 50,297 || 41-33
|- align="center" bgcolor="bbffbb"
| 75 || June 29 || Mariners || 4 – 0 || Timlin (6-4) || DeLucia (6-5) || Ward (14) || 50,268 || 42-33
|- align="center" bgcolor="bbffbb"
| 76 || June 30 || Mariners || 6 – 1 || Stottlemyre (9-3) || Holman (7-8) || || 50,298 || 43-33
|-

|- align="center" bgcolor="bbffbb"
| 77 || July 1 || Mariners || 4 – 3 || Acker (2-4) || Jackson (4-3) || || 50,270 || 44-33
|- align="center" bgcolor="bbffbb"
| 78 || July 2 || Twins || 4 – 3 || Ward (2-3) || Leach (0-1) || || 48,676 || 45-33
|- align="center" bgcolor="bbffbb"
| 79 || July 3 || Twins || 4 – 0 || Candiotti (8-7) || Anderson (4-7) || || 50,071 || 46-33
|- align="center" bgcolor="ffbbbb"
| 80 || July 4 || Twins || 1 – 0 || West (1-0) || Key (10-4) || Aguilera (21) || 50,293 || 46-34
|- align="center" bgcolor="bbffbb"
| 81 || July 5 || @ Mariners || 2 – 1 || MacDonald (2-0) || Holman (7-9) || Henke (15) || 21,647 || 47-34
|- align="center" bgcolor="bbffbb"
| 82 || July 6 || @ Mariners || 4 – 3 (10) || Timlin (7-4) || Swan (3-2) || Henke (16) || 48,750 || 48-34
|- align="center" bgcolor="bbffbb"
| 83 || July 7 || @ Mariners || 5 – 2 || Guzmán (3-2) || Hanson (4-4) || || 27,812 || 49-34
|- align="center" bgcolor="bbffbb"
| 84 || July 11 || Rangers || 2 – 0 || Candiotti (9-7) || Brown (7-7) || Henke (17) || 50,276 || 50-34
|- align="center" bgcolor="bbffbb"
| 85 || July 12 || Rangers || 6 – 2 || Wells (10-4) || Guzmán (4-4) || Ward (15) || 50,279 || 51-34
|- align="center" bgcolor="bbffbb"
| 86 || July 13 || Rangers || 3 – 2 || Timlin (8-4) || Russell (3-2) || Henke (18) || 50,270 || 52-34
|- align="center" bgcolor="ffbbbb"
| 87 || July 14 || Rangers || 8 – 6 || Barfield (4-3) || Key (10-5) || Russell (18) || 50,294 || 52-35
|- align="center" bgcolor="bbffbb"
| 88 || July 15 || @ Royals || 5 – 3 (12) || Timlin (9-4) || Crawford (2-1) || Henke (19) || 29,723 || 53-35
|- align="center" bgcolor="ffbbbb"
| 89 || July 16 || @ Royals || 2 – 1 (10) || Aquino (2-2) || Candiotti (9-8) || || 22,134 || 53-36
|- align="center" bgcolor="bbffbb"
| 90 || July 18 || @ Rangers || 4 – 0 || Wells (11-4) || Ryan (5-5) || Ward (16) || 37,268 || 54-36
|- align="center" bgcolor="bbffbb"
| 91 || July 19 || @ Rangers || 7 – 2 || Stottlemyre (10-3) || Barfield (4-4) || Timlin (3) || 35,144 || 55-36
|- align="center" bgcolor="ffbbbb"
| 92 || July 20 || @ Rangers || 11 – 6 || Jeffcoat (4-2) || Key (10-6) || || 39,276 || 55-37
|- align="center" bgcolor="ffbbbb"
| 93 || July 21 || @ Rangers || 6 – 5 || Rogers (6-7) || Timlin (9-5) || Russell (19) || 31,803 || 55-38
|- align="center" bgcolor="ffbbbb"
| 94 || July 23 || @ White Sox || 3 – 2 || Thigpen (7-3) || Candiotti (9-9) || || 34,779 || 55-39
|- align="center" bgcolor="bbffbb"
| 95 || July 24 || @ White Sox || 2 – 1 || Wells (12-4) || McDowell (12-5) || Henke (20) || 39,599 || 56-39
|- align="center" bgcolor="ffbbbb"
| 96 || July 25 || @ White Sox || 7 – 1 || Hough (6-6) || Stottlemyre (10-4) || || 42,796 || 56-40
|- align="center" bgcolor="bbffbb"
| 97 || July 26 || Royals || 6 – 5 (11) || Ward (3-3) || Gordon (5-9) || || 50,326 || 57-40
|- align="center" bgcolor="ffbbbb"
| 98 || July 27 || Royals || 5 – 2 (10) || Gordon (6-9) || Timlin (9-6) || Montgomery (19) || 50,291 || 57-41
|- align="center" bgcolor="ffbbbb"
| 99 || July 28 || Royals || 10 – 4 || Gubicza (6-5) || Candiotti (9-10) || Davis (2) || 50,291 || 57-42
|- align="center" bgcolor="ffbbbb"
| 100 || July 29 || White Sox || 12 – 4 || McDowell (13-5) || Wells (12-5) || || 50,298 || 57-43
|- align="center" bgcolor="ffbbbb"
| 101 || July 30 || White Sox || 8 – 7 || Radinsky (3-3) || MacDonald (2-1) || Thigpen (24) || 50,291 || 57-44
|- align="center" bgcolor="bbffbb"
| 102 || July 31 || Indians || 3 – 1 || Key (11-6) || King (4-6) || Henke (21) || 50,276 || 58-44
|-

|- align="center" bgcolor="bbffbb"
| 103 || August 1 || Indians || 7 – 5 || Ward (4-3) || Shaw (0-4) || Henke (22) || 50,275 || 59-44
|- align="center" bgcolor="ffbbbb"
| 104 || August 2 || @ Red Sox || 5 – 3 || Clemens (12-7) || Candiotti (9-11) || || 34,032 || 59-45
|- align="center" bgcolor="ffbbbb"
| 105 || August 3 || @ Red Sox || 4 – 1 || Hesketh (5-2) || Wells (12-6) || Reardon (25) || 34,015 || 59-46
|- align="center" bgcolor="bbffbb"
| 106 || August 4 || @ Red Sox || 2 – 1 || Ward (5-3) || Lamp (3-3) || Henke (23) || 33,809 || 60-46
|- align="center" bgcolor="bbffbb"
| 107 || August 6 || Tigers || 2 – 1 || Key (12-6) || Cerutti (1-4) || Henke (24) || 50,305 || 61-46
|- align="center" bgcolor="bbffbb"
| 108 || August 7 || Tigers || 5 – 2 || Guzmán (4-2) || Tanana (8-8) || Henke (25) || 50,324 || 62-46
|- align="center" bgcolor="ffbbbb"
| 109 || August 8 || Tigers || 4 – 0 (14) || Gibson (5-5) || Henke (0-1) || || 50,307 || 62-47
|- align="center" bgcolor="ffbbbb"
| 110 || August 9 || Red Sox || 12 – 7 || Hesketh (6-2) || Wells (12-7) || Reardon (26) || 50,319 || 62-48
|- align="center" bgcolor="ffbbbb"
| 111 || August 10 || Red Sox || 7 – 1 || Harris (8-11) || Stottlemyre (10-5) || || 50,304 || 62-49
|- align="center" bgcolor="ffbbbb"
| 112 || August 11 || Red Sox || 9 – 6 || Gardiner (4-6) || Key (12-7) || Reardon (27) || 50,297 || 62-50
|- align="center" bgcolor="ffbbbb"
| 113 || August 12 || Red Sox || 11 – 8 || Lamp (4-3) || Ward (5-4) || Reardon (28) || 50,305 || 62-51
|- align="center" bgcolor="ffbbbb"
| 114 || August 13 || @ Brewers || 5 – 4 || Crim (7-5) || Henke (0-2) || || 22,996 || 62-52
|- align="center" bgcolor="ffbbbb"
| 115 || August 14 || @ Brewers || 5 – 3 || Bosio (9-8) || Wells (12-8) || Henry (3) || 19,193 || 62-53
|- align="center" bgcolor="bbffbb"
| 116 || August 15 || @ Brewers || 4 – 1 || Stottlemyre (11-5) || Plesac (1-5) || Henke (26) || 24,519 || 63-53
|- align="center" bgcolor="ffbbbb"
| 117 || August 16 || @ Tigers || 5 – 2 || Cerutti (2-4) || Key (12-8) || Gakeler (1) || 43,186 || 63-54
|- align="center" bgcolor="bbffbb"
| 118 || August 17 || @ Tigers || 7 – 5 || MacDonald (3-1) || Aldred (0-2) || Henke (27) || 46,634 || 64-54
|- align="center" bgcolor="bbffbb"
| 119 || August 18 || @ Tigers || 4 – 2 || Candiotti (10-11) || Kaiser (0-1) || Henke (28) || 48,724 || 65-54
|- align="center" bgcolor="bbffbb"
| 120 || August 20 || Brewers || 3 – 1 || Stottlemyre (12-5) || Bosio (9-9) || Henke (29) || 50,311 || 66-54
|- align="center" bgcolor="ffbbbb"
| 121 || August 21 || Brewers || 3 – 0 || Machado (1-3) || Key (12-9) || Núñez (8) || 50,306 || 66-55
|- align="center" bgcolor="ffbbbb"
| 122 || August 22 || Brewers || 8 – 7 || Ignasiak (1-0) || Ward (5-5) || Henry (5) || 50,309 || 66-56
|- align="center" bgcolor="bbffbb"
| 123 || August 23 || Yankees || 6 – 5 || Ward (6-5) || Farr (3-4) || || 50,318 || 67-56
|- align="center" bgcolor="ffbbbb"
| 124 || August 24 || Yankees || 6 – 5 || Johnson (5-7) || Wells (12-9) || Cadaret (2) || 50,324 || 67-57
|- align="center" bgcolor="bbffbb"
| 125 || August 25 || Yankees || 11 – 7 || Acker (3-4) || Guetterman (2-2) || || 50,320 || 68-57
|- align="center" bgcolor="bbffbb"
| 126 || August 26 || @ Orioles || 5 – 2 || Key (13-9) || Johnson (4-5) || Henke (30) || 28,063 || 69-57
|- align="center" bgcolor="bbffbb"
| 127 || August 27 || @ Orioles || 6 – 1 || Guzmán (5-2) || Rhodes (0-1) || || 25,090 || 70-57
|- align="center" bgcolor="bbffbb"
| 128 || August 28 || @ Orioles || 3 – 0 || Candiotti (11-11) || McDonald (5-8) || Henke (31) || 28,262 || 71-57
|- align="center" bgcolor="bbffbb"
| 129 || August 29 || @ Yankees || 6 – 2 || Wells (13-9) || Johnson (5-8) || || 19,344 || 72-57
|- align="center" bgcolor="ffbbbb"
| 130 || August 30 || @ Yankees || 9 – 2 || Sanderson (14-8) || Stottlemyre (12-6) || || 19,393 || 72-58
|- align="center" bgcolor="bbffbb"
| 131 || August 31 || @ Yankees || 5 – 0 || Key (14-9) || Cadaret (6-5) || Ward (17) || 28,932 || 73-58
|-

|- align="center" bgcolor="ffbbbb"
| 132 || September 1 || @ Yankees || 4 – 2 || Guetterman (3-2) || MacDonald (3-2) || || 25,105 || 73-59
|- align="center" bgcolor="bbffbb"
| 133 || September 2 || Orioles || 5 – 4 (12) || Timlin (12-6) || Olson (3-5) || || 50,314 || 74-59
|- align="center" bgcolor="ffbbbb"
| 134 || September 3 || Orioles || 8 – 4 || McDonald (6-8) || Wells (13-10) || Flanagan (3) || 50,299 || 74-60
|- align="center" bgcolor="bbffbb"
| 135 || September 4 || Orioles || 3 – 1 || Stottlemyre (13-6) || Milacki (8-8) || Ward (18) || 50,303 || 75-60
|- align="center" bgcolor="bbffbb"
| 136 || September 5 || @ Indians || 13 – 1 || Key (15-9) || Nagy (8-12) || || 5,666 || 76-60
|- align="center" bgcolor="bbffbb"
| 137 || September 6 || @ Indians || 7 – 4 || Guzmán (6-2) || Otto (1-6) || Ward (19) || 14,533 || 77-60
|- align="center" bgcolor="bbffbb"
| 138 || September 7 || @ Indians || 4 – 1 || Candiotti (12-11) || Swindell (8-14) || || 17,830 || 78-60
|- align="center" bgcolor="bbffbb"
| 139 || September 8 || @ Indians || 11 – 5 || Wells (14-10) || King (5-10) || || 13,071 || 79-60
|- align="center" bgcolor="ffbbbb"
| 140 || September 10 || Mariners || 5 – 4 || Holman (13-13) || Stottlemyre (13-7) || Jones (1) || 50,196 || 79-61
|- align="center" bgcolor="ffbbbb"
| 141 || September 11 || Mariners || 7 – 3 || Hanson (8-7) || Key (15-10) || || 50,321 || 79-62
|- align="center" bgcolor="bbffbb"
| 142 || September 13 || Athletics || 7 – 6 || Guzmán (7-2) || Stewart (11-9) || Henke (32) || 50,315 || 80-62
|- align="center" bgcolor="bbffbb"
| 143 || September 14 || Athletics || 6 – 0 || Candiotti (13-11) || Welch (11-12) || || 50,319 || 81-62
|- align="center" bgcolor="ffbbbb"
| 144 || September 15 || Athletics || 10 – 5 || Moore (14-8) || Stottlemyre (13-8) || Eckersley (40) || 50,315 || 81-63
|- align="center" bgcolor="ffbbbb"
| 145 || September 16 || @ Mariners || 6 – 5 (11) || Swan (5-2) || MacDonald (3-3) || || 55,612 || 81-64
|- align="center" bgcolor="ffbbbb"
| 146 || September 17 || @ Mariners || 5 – 4 (11) || Schooler (2-2) || Acker (3-5) || || 29,115 || 81-65
|- align="center" bgcolor="bbffbb"
| 147 || September 18 || @ Mariners || 5 – 3 (12) || Ward (7-5) || Bankhead (2-6) || Acker (1) || 30,200 || 82-65
|- align="center" bgcolor="ffbbbb"
| 148 || September 20 || @ Athletics || 6 – 5 (11) || Eckersley (5-3) || Ward (7-6) || || 33,765 || 82-66
|- align="center" bgcolor="ffbbbb"
| 149 || September 21 || @ Athletics || 4 – 0 || Moore (15-8) || Key (15-11) || || 36,601 || 82-67
|- align="center" bgcolor="bbffbb"
| 150 || September 22 || @ Athletics || 3 – 2 || Guzmán (8-2) || Darling (3-5) || Wells (1) || 28,276 || 83-67
|- align="center" bgcolor="ffbbbb"
| 151 || September 23 || @ Angels || 10 – 9 || Lewis (3-5) || Candiotti (13-12) || Harvey (43) || 20,001 || 83-68
|- align="center" bgcolor="bbffbb"
| 152 || September 24 || @ Angels || 3 – 0 (10) || Wells (15-10) || Abbott (17-10) || || 21,538 || 84-68
|- align="center" bgcolor="bbffbb"
| 153 || September 25 || @ Angels || 7 – 2 || Key (16-11) || Langston (17-8) || || 19,251 || 85-68
|- align="center" bgcolor="bbffbb"
| 154 || September 27 || Twins || 7 – 2 || Guzmán (9-2) || Tapani (16-9) || || 50,326 || 86-68
|- align="center" bgcolor="ffbbbb"
| 155 || September 28 || Twins || 5 – 0 || Morris (18-12) || Candiotti (13-13) || || 50,319 || 86-69
|- align="center" bgcolor="bbffbb"
| 156 || September 29 || Twins || 2 – 1 || Stottlemyre (14-8) || Erickson (19-8) || Ward (20) || 50,315 || 87-69
|- align="center" bgcolor="ffbbbb"
| 157 || September 30 || Angels || 2 – 1 || Langston (18-8) || Key (16-12) || Harvey (45) || 50,321 || 87-70
|-

|- align="center" bgcolor="bbffbb"
| 158 || October 1 || Angels || 5 – 2 || Guzmán (10-2) || Fetters (2-5) || Ward (21) || 50,322 || 88-70
|- align="center" bgcolor="bbffbb"
| 159 || October 2 || Angels || 6 – 5 || Timlin (11-6) || Harvey (2-4) || || 50,324 || 89-70
|- align="center" bgcolor="bbffbb"
| 160 || October 4 || @ Twins || 4 – 1 || Stottlemyre (15-8) || Neagle (0-1) || Ward (22) || 35,124 || 90-70
|- align="center" bgcolor="ffbbbb"
| 161 || October 5 || @ Twins || 3 – 1 || Erickson (20-8) || Guzmán (10-3) || Aguilera (42) || 51,058 || 90-71
|- align="center" bgcolor="bbffbb"
| 162 || October 6 || @ Twins || 3 – 2 (10) || Weathers (1-0) || Anderson (5-11) || Ward (23) || 37,794 || 91-71
|-

|- align="center" bgcolor="ffbbbb"
| 1 || October 8 || @ Twins || 5 – 4 || Morris (1-0) || Candiotti (0-1) || Aguilera (1) || 54,766 || 0-1
|- align="center" bgcolor="bbffbb"
| 2 || October 9 || @ Twins || 5 – 2 || Guzman (1-0) || Tapani (0-1) || Ward (1) || 54,816  || 1-1
|- align="center" bgcolor="ffbbbb"
| 3 || October 11 || Twins || 3 – 2 (10) || Guthrie (1-0) || Timlin (0-1) || Aguilera (2) || 51,454 || 1-2
|- align="center" bgcolor="ffbbbb"
| 4 || October 12 || Twins || 9 – 3 || Morris (2-0) || Stottlemyre (0-1) ||  || 51,526 || 1-3
|- align="center" bgcolor="ffbbbb"
| 5 || October 13 || Twins || 8 – 5 || West (1-0) || Ward (0-1) || Aguilera (3) || 51,425 || 1-4
|-

All-Star game
The Blue Jays hosted the 1991 Major League Baseball All-Star Game. It was the 62nd Midsummer Classic and was played on July 9 at SkyDome. Roberto Alomar was voted in as the starting second baseman for the American League, while pitcher Jimmy Key and outfielder Joe Carter were named as reserves on the AL team. Key got the win as the American League's All-Stars triumphed over the National League All-Stars, 4-2.

Player stats

Batting

Starters by position
Note: Pos = Position; G = Games played; AB = At bats; H = Hits; Avg. = Batting average; HR = Home runs; RBI = Runs batted in

Other batters
Note: G = Games played; AB = At bats; H = Hits; Avg. = Batting average; HR = Home runs; RBI = Runs batted in

Pitching

Starting pitchers
Note: G = Games pitched; IP = Innings pitched; W = Wins; L = Losses; ERA = Earned run average; SO = Strikeouts

Other pitchers
Note: G = Games pitched; IP = Innings pitched; W = Wins; L = Losses; ERA = Earned run average; SO = Strikeouts

Relief pitchers
Note: G = Games pitched; W = Wins; L = Losses; SV = Saves; ERA = Earned run average; SO = Strikeouts

ALCS

Game 1
October 8, Hubert H. Humphrey Metrodome

Game 2
October 9, Hubert H. Humphrey Metrodome

Game 3
October 11, Skydome

Game 4
October 12, Skydome

Game 5
October 13, Skydome

Award winners
 Roberto Alomar, 2B, Gold Glove Award
 Joe Carter, Player of the Month Award, June
 Joe Carter, OF, Silver Slugger Award
 Juan Guzman, P, The Sporting News Rookie of the Year Award
 Devon White, OF, Gold Glove Award

All-Star Game
 Roberto Alomar, 2B, starter
 Joe Carter, OF, reserve
 Jimmy Key, P, reserve

Farm system

References

External links
1991 Toronto Blue Jays at Baseball Reference
1991 Toronto Blue Jays at Baseball Almanac

Toronto Blue Jays seasons
American League East champion seasons
Toronto Blue Jays season
Toronto
1991 in Toronto